Melanterite is a mineral form of hydrous iron(II) sulfate: FeSO4·7H2O. It is the iron analogue of the copper sulfate chalcanthite. It alters to siderotil by loss of water. It is a secondary sulfate mineral which forms from the oxidation of primary sulfide minerals such as pyrite and marcasite in the near-surface environment. It often occurs as a post mine encrustation on old underground mine surfaces. It also occurs in coal and lignite seams exposed to humid air and as a rare sublimate phase around volcanic fumaroles. Associated minerals include pisanite, chalcanthite, epsomite, pickeringite, halotrichite and other sulfate minerals.

It was first described in 1850.

Gallery

References

Sulfate minerals
Iron(II) minerals
Monoclinic minerals
Minerals in space group 14
Hydrates